Great Missenden is an affluent village with approximately 2,000 residents in the Misbourne Valley in the Chiltern Hills in Buckinghamshire, England, situated between the towns of Amersham and Wendover, with direct rail connections to London Marylebone. It closely adjoins the village of Little Kingshill, and is a mile from Little Missenden and the larger village Prestwood. The narrow and historic High Street is bypassed by the main A413 London to Aylesbury Road. It is located in the centre of the Chilterns Area of Outstanding Natural Beauty. The source of the Misbourne is to be found just north of the village, although the upper reach of the river runs only in winter and the perennial head is in Little Missenden. The village is now best known as home to the late Roald Dahl, the world-famous Adult and Children's  author.

In 2019 the village post town and postcode of HP16, which encompasses Little Kingshill, was revealed to be the most affluent place in England, with The Guardian writing that "the least deprived neighbourhood in England is an area...near Great Missenden in Buckinghamshire, and a few kilometres to the south of the prime minister’s country residence at Chequers." The Guardian has also featured an article referring to how the village has been "prime stockbroker belt for over a century" and remarked favourably on its "grand piles tucked away in the folds of the Chilterns, all paddocks, ponies and leafy lanes, such as Dahl's, Martinsend Lane, or Nags Head Lane." The article also  mentions its "ancient churches, beech woods, deep valleys, rolling Chiltern Hills, higgledy-piggledy streets. That's why Dahl chose to live here." The Daily Telegraph, meanwhile, lists Great Missenden in its "List of Britain's richest villages." The Telegraph also ranked the village #4 in its "Best Places to Raise a Family in the UK" 2015 survey, describing it as a "gem of a town."

Etymology
The name Missenden is first attested in the Domesday Book as Missedene, with other early attestations including the spellings Messedena and Musindone. The -den element probably comes from Old English denu, meaning 'valley', but the etymology of the first element is uncertain. It is thought to occur in the name of the River Misbourne, which rises in Great Missenden, and also in the Hertfordshire place-name Miswell. Frank Stenton and Allen Mawer guessed that it came from a hypothetical Anglo-Saxon personal name Myrsa, which they also supposed to be found in the name of Mursley. Eilert Ekwall suggested that it came from a lost Old English word related to English moss, and to Danish mysse and Swedish missne (which denote plants of the genus Calla, such as water arum). Recent researchers have tentatively preferred Ekwall's guess, in which case the name Missenden would once have meant something like 'valley where water-plants/marsh-plants grow'.

History 
Great Missenden lay on a major route between the Midlands and London. Several coaching inns, particularly the Red Lion (now an estate agency) and The George (with new owners), provided rest and refreshment for travellers and their horses. The first railway line in the area was, however, routed alongside the Grand Union Canal to the east. Once the coaches stopped running Great Missenden declined in importance and prosperity, becoming an agricultural village. Following the arrival of the Metropolitan Railway, (later the London Underground's Metropolitan line) in 1892, Great Missenden became a commuter village for London with writers, entertainers and even Prime Ministers among the resident. Great Missenden railway station is now on the Chiltern Railways line and offers fast and reliable services running into London Marylebone; it is the first station on the line that does not fall into a London Zone.

The village is overlooked by the medieval Church of England parish church, the Church of St Peter and St Paul, whereas the High Street itself is home to the Catholic Church of The Immaculate Heart of Mary, one of the largest Catholic churches in the Chiltern District.  The position of the parish church away from the village centre suggests an earlier settlement around the church with a move of the village's heart to its present location in the early Middle Ages. In the twelfth century Great Missenden was granted a charter allowing it to hold an annual Fair in August. Missenden Abbey, founded in 1133 as an Augustinian monastery, was ruined following the Dissolution of the Monasteries, and the remains were incorporated into a Georgian mansion which is now a conference centre.

Gipsy House in Great Missenden was the home of author Roald Dahl from 1954 until his death in 1990, and still remains in the family, and many local scenes and characters are reflected in his work. Dahl is buried at St. Peter and St. Paul's Church and children still leave toys and flowers at his grave. In June 2005 the Roald Dahl Museum and Story Centre opened in Great Missenden to honour the work of Dahl. 

Great Missenden, and its neighbouring village of Little Kingshill, is home to a number of celebrities and major figures in the world of finance and industry. It was home to actor Geoffrey Palmer, and his wife Sally still lives there. Model turned cookery show presenter Sophie Dahl (granddaughter of Roald Dahl) and her husband jazz musician Jamie Cullum also own a property in the village. 

Robert Louis Stevenson, the writer of famous works such as Treasure Island and the Strange Case of Dr Jekyll and Mr Hyde, stayed a night at The Red Lion, now 62 High Street, in Great Missenden in October 1874, which he wrote in an essay called "An Autumn Effect".

The espionage novelist David Cornwell, who wrote as John le Carré, noted in a posthumously published introduction to a 2021 reissue of his first novel, Call for the Dead, that "I lived in Great Missenden in those days and commuted to Marylebone station".

The village is home to the private Gateway School, Great Missenden Combined School and The Misbourne secondary school. Many children attend the local grammar schools in nearby Amersham, Chesham, Little Chalfont and High Wycombe, as well as leading local preparatory schools such as Chesham Prep, which consistently makes The Tatler list of Best Prep Schools in the UK.

Given its quaint and historic high street, the village has been used extensively as a filming location for TV drama Midsomer Murders. During 1980, Hammer Film Productions filmed a small series of horror films for television, many of them filmed in and around Great Missenden. Of note is the episode "Rude Awakening" starring Denholm Elliott who plays an Estate Agent trapped in a recurring nightmare. The location of the premises used as the Estate Agent's office is located in the centre of the village. Nowadays the property is a barbers.

Demography

At the 2001 UK census, the Great Missenden electoral ward had a population of 2,192. The ethnicity was 98.1% white, 0.7% mixed race, 0.5% Asian, 0.5% black and 0.2% other. The place of birth of residents was 90.6% United Kingdom, 1.5% Republic of Ireland, 2.8% other Western European countries, and 5.1% elsewhere. Religion was recorded as 77.7% Christian, 0% Buddhist, 0.2% Hindu, 0.1% Sikh, 0% Jewish, and 0.1% Muslim. 14.2% were recorded as having no religion, 0.3% had an alternative religion and 7.4% did not state their religion.

The economic activity of residents aged 16–74 was 35.7% in full-time employment, 11.3% in part-time employment, 14.9% self-employed, 1.9% unemployed, 1.9% students with jobs, 3.8% students without jobs, 19% retired, 8% looking after home or family, 2% permanently sick or disabled and 1.6% economically inactive for other reasons. The industry of employment of residents was 13.3% retail, 11.6% manufacturing, 5.5% construction, 24.1% real estate, 9.7% health and social work, 8.8% education, 4.7% transport and communications, 3.6% public administration, 4.2% hotels and restaurants, 4.3% finance, 1.9% agriculture and 8.3% other. Compared with national figures, the ward had a relatively high proportion of workers in agriculture and real estate. There were a relatively low proportion in public administration, transport and communications. Of the ward's residents aged 16–74, 35.8% had a higher education qualification or the equivalent, compared with 19.9% nationwide.

Parish
 Ballinger, located northeast of Great Missenden, between Lee Common and Ballinger Common
 Ballinger Bottom, located northeast of Great Missenden, near South Heath
 Ballinger Common, located northeast of Great Missenden, near Ballinger
 Bryant's Bottom, located west of Prestwood, near Speen
 Frith-hill, located east of Great Missenden
 Heath End, located near the border with Hughenden parish, near Great Kingshill
 Hotley Bottom, located north of Prestwood
 Hyde End, located between South Heath and Hyde Heath
 Hyde Heath, located near Little Missenden
 Little Wood Corner, located south of South Heath
 Mobwell, located in Great Missenden
 Prestwood, large village west of Great Missenden
 South Heath, located northeast of Great Missenden

Governance 
Great Missenden civil parish is split between three South Bucks District Council wards: Prestwood and Heath End, Great Missenden, and Ballinger, South Heath and Chartridge; and two Buckinghamshire County Council divisions: Great Missenden and Chiltern Ridges. It is wholly within the Chesham and Amersham parliamentary constituency, represented since 2020 by  Sarah Green, (Liberal Democrat).

Notable residents 
Clement Attlee, former Prime Minister of the United Kingdom
David Cornwell (John le Carre), English novelist
Jamie Cullum, English musician
Roald Dahl, British novelist
Sophie Dahl, English author
Patricia Neal, American actress
Geoffrey Palmer, English actor
Robert Louis Stevenson, Scottish novelist
Harold Wilson, former Prime Minister of the United Kingdom

References

External links

Malt The Brewery - Micro Brewery in Prestwood making real ales, website
Great Missenden Parish Church website
Great Missenden CofE Combined School website
Roald Dahl Museum official site
The Misbourne School website
AFC Lightning football club website

 
Villages in Buckinghamshire
Civil parishes in Buckinghamshire
Chiltern District